Antoine Marbot may refer to:

 Jean-Antoine Marbot (1754–1800), French divisional general and politician
 Antoine Adolphe Marcelin Marbot (1781–1844), French maréchal de camp (brigadier general)

See also
 

Marbot, Antoine